The Ghana Free Zones Authority (GFZA), is a Ghanaian government-controlled institution formed on 31 August 1995 to facilitate the setting up of Free Zone in Ghana  to improve the economic development and to regulate its related activities. It was enacted by an Act of Parliament, the Free Zone Act 1995 (Act 504).

The authority was planned to improve the processing and manufacturing of goods through the formation of Export Processing Zones (EPZs) to boost the development of commercial and service activities at the sea and airport areas. It was also intended to make Ghana available to possible investors who have the freedom of using the free zones to boost the production of goods and services for foreign markets.

Structure

The Board 
The President in deliberation with the Council of State has appointed nine members of the Free Zones Authority which is presided over by the Minister of Trade and Industry. It started in September 1996 and the board works under the regulation (L.I. 1618).

References 

Economy of Ghana
Government agencies of Ghana